Strategic Negotiations: A Theory of Change in Labor-Management Relations, a 1994 Harvard Business School Press publication, is a book on negotiation by the authors; Richard E. Walton, Joel Cutcher-Gershenfeld, and Robert McKersie.

The book explains concepts and strategies of negotiation to the reader.

Summary
In the book, the authors identify three primary negotiation strategies. These are "forcing," "fostering," and "escape". Each represents an overarching pattern of interaction that characterizes the negotiations. A strategy does not emerge all at once, but over time as a result of consistent patterns of interaction.

A forcing strategy generally involves taking a "distributive" or win–lose approach to the negotiations, combined with a "divide and conquer" approach to internal relations in the other side, and an attitudinal approach that emphasizes uncertainty and distrust. By contrast, a fostering strategy generally involves taking an "integrative" or win-win approach to the negotiations, combined with a "consensus" approach to internal relations in both sides, and an attitudinal approach that emphasizes openness and understanding. "Escape" is a non-negotiations strategy in which one or more parties seek to end or undercut the relationship, which leads to a loss-loss situation.

These strategy and process elements of negotiations can be combined with an understanding of structure in order to predict outcomes that are both substantive and relationship outcomes.

See also
 Conflict resolution research
 List of books about negotiation
 Negotiation theory

References

External links
 Strategic Negotiations: A Theory of Change in Labor-Management Relations

Business books
1994 non-fiction books
Negotiation
Personal development
Harvard Business Publishing books